The Lithuanian and Belаrussian Constitutional Catholic Party was a political party in the Russian empire, founded by the Vilna bishop Eduard von der Ropp on February 7, 1906. It sought unification of the lands of the former Grand Duchy of Lithuania. It worked for the establishment of a Polish government administration and the setting up of Polish armed forces. The party demanded exemption for Catholics from compulsory tithing to the Russian Orthodox Church, autonomy for the Catholic Church to run its own training of its clergy without government interference and the right for Catholic bishops to have direct links with the Holy See. Von der Ropp was elected to the State Duma of the Russian Empire.

External links
Party Program (1906)

References

Political parties established in 1906
Political parties of minorities in Imperial Russia
Catholic political parties
1906 establishments in the Russian Empire